Ladomerská Vieska is a village and municipality in Žiar nad Hronom District in the Banská Bystrica Region of central Slovakia.

History
In historical records the village was first time mentioned in 1335 AD.

Geography
The municipality lies at an altitude of 262 metres and covers an area of 11.337 km². It has a population of 782 people (2004).

External links
 https://web.archive.org/web/20080111223415/http://www.statistics.sk/mosmis/eng/run.html

Villages and municipalities in Žiar nad Hronom District